Linda Hadjar birth name "Lynda Hadjar" (born 4 March 1982 in Rodez, Aveyron) is a former French middle and long distance runner, who specialized in 3000/5000 meters and cross-country.

She finished 6th at 5000 meters at the 2003 European Athletics U23 Championships in Bydgoszcz, Poland. Before that Hadjar also won 3 French national championships in cross-country. Hadjar left a big impression winning her first national title with a 30-second lead. She took 39th place at the Cross-Country world championship at her first major international competition in Vilamoura.

Hadjar realized the 3rd best French performance of all time U23 on the 3000 meters.

Track and field outdoor championships 
 1st place at the French championship 800m Dreux FRA (CA)
 1st place at the French championship  3000 m (JU)
 6th place at the 2003 European Athletics U23 Championships 5000 m Bydgoszcz POL
 11th place at the French outdoor Championship 5000 m Narbonne FRA

Cross-Country championships 
 1st at the French Cross-Country Championships (JU) Carhaix-Plouguer FRA
 1st at the French Cross-Country Championships (JU) Grande Synthe FRA
 1st at the French Cross-Country Championships  (ES) Saint-Quentin-en-Yvelines FRA                                                   
 39th at the IAAF World Junior Cross-Country Championships
 40th at the SPAR European Junior Cross-Country Championships Thun SUI
 54th at the IAAF World Junior Cross-Country Championships Ostend BEL
 22 selections for French teams.

References 

1982 births
Living people
People from Rodez
French female middle-distance runners
French female long-distance runners
Sportspeople from Aveyron